Hong Kong competed at the 2011 Summer Universiade in Shenzhen, China.

Basketball

Hong Kong has qualified a men's team.

Gymnastics

Wong Hiu Ying Angel has qualified into individual all-around final at 22nd place and vault final at 3rd place. In the individual all-around final, Wong finished 15th with a total score of 48.350. In the vault final, Wong won a bronze medal with an average score of 13.650.

Ng Kiu Chung finished 69th in the preliminary round and did not advance into any final.

Volleyball

Hong Kong has qualified both a men's and a women's team.

References

Nations at the 2011 Summer Universiade
Summer Universiade
Hong Kong at the Summer Universiade